Schoenobius immeritalis is a moth in the family Crambidae. It was described by Francis Walker in 1859. It is found in Sri Lanka and Fujian, China.

Description
The wingspan of the male is 14–20 mm and the female is 14–28 mm. Palpi with second joint about twice the length of head. Male bright ochreous-yellow colored. Hindwings paler. Female straw colored with fulvous anal tuft and whitish hindwings.

References

Moths described in 1859
Schoenobiinae